Beyond the Border is a 2011 Swedish war film directed by Richard Holm with André Sjöberg, Antti Reini and Bjørn Sundquist in the main roles.

Plot
In 1942 in the Swedish province of Värmland bordering Nazi-occupied Norway, a group of Swedish soldiers leave their post at a check-point in neutral Sweden, and ends up on the wrong side of the border. One soldier is killed and another captured by the Germans, and a rescue operation is underway. However, a Swedish  colonel sends out an execution squad to eliminate the lost soldiers and their rescuers, in order to cover up the mistake. The lost Swedish soldiers now suddenly face two different enemies on their way home across the border.

Cast
 André Sjöberg as 1Lt. Aron Stenström 
 Antti Reini as Cpl. Wille Järvinen 
 Bjørn Sundquist as Egil 
 Johan Hedenberg as Maj. Adolfsson 
 Marie Robertson as Karin Lindström 
 Martin Wallström as Pvt. Sven Stenström 
 Rasmus Troedsson as Cpt. Keller 
 Jens Hultén as Pvt. Hagman
 Henrik Norlén as Pvt. Wicksell 
 Jonas Karlström as Pvt. Bergström
 Anders Nordahl as Axel Halvars
 Andreas Zetterberg as Pvt. Johansson
 Donald Högberg as Colonel Dunér
 Ingmar Robertson as Fu. Ekberg
 Susanne Thorson as Kaeja
 Jörgen Einar as Pvt. Olsson 
 Robert Follin as Uno Larsson
 Jan Vilagos as German Groupleader
 Henrik Johansson as German Torturer
 Anton Damperud as Soldier
 Mathias Alstadsäter as Soldier
 Christer Broström as Soldier

Awards and nominations

See also
Sweden during World War II

External links
 
 

2011 films
2010s Swedish-language films
2011 war drama films
Swedish drama films
Western Front of World War II films
Films set in 1942
Films set in Norway
Films set in Sweden
Films shot in Norway
Films shot in Sweden
Värmland in fiction
2011 drama films
2010s Swedish films